The Orchid Line is a multi-gauge miniature railway operating within the Curraghs Wildlife Park in the north of the Isle of Man and is operated by the Manx Model Engineering Society. It was opened in May 1992. The track combines up to three gauges,  inch, 5 inch and  inch.

See also
Transport on the Isle of Man
Rail transport in the Isle of Man
British narrow gauge railways

Notes and References

External links

Manx Steam and Model Engineering Club
The Orchid Line on openstreetmap.org

Railway lines in the Isle of Man